The Hofstra University Arboretum is an arboretum located across the Hofstra University campus, in Hempstead, New York. Hofstra's campus is a member of the American Public Gardens Association, and is one of 430 arboreta in the United States.

The Hofstra campus contains more than 12,000 evergreen and deciduous trees, representing 625 species and varieties of woody plants. The arboretum includes both native and exotic trees. A bird sanctuary has also been developed on two acres of land, serving as an educational prototype for the state of New York.

See also 
 List of botanical gardens and arboretums in the United States

References

External links 
 

Arboreta in New York (state)
Hofstra University
Hempstead (village), New York
Tourist attractions in Nassau County, New York
Protected areas of Nassau County, New York